Khirod Chandra Malick (born 26 April 1958) is the founder of an NGO Bharat Integrated Social Welfare Agency (BISWA).  he was chairman of the group since its foundation in 1994 and is involved in the process of grassroots social engineering. Before starting the NGO, Malick worked at State Bank of India for 26 years, leaving as a senior executive.

References

External links
 

Businesspeople from Odisha
Living people
1958 births